

Frantz Charlet (1862–1928) was a Belgian painter, etcher, and lithographer.

Early life and career
An Impressionist, he was one of the founding members of the group Les XX.  He studied at the Académie Royale des Beaux-Arts in Brussels from 1872 until 1873 and again from 1876 to 1881; among his fellow pupils there were Eugène Broerman, François-Joseph Halkett, Théo van Rysselberghe and Rodolphe Wytsman, and his teacher was Jean-François Portaels.

Gallery

See also
Les XX

References
Frantz Charlet at artnet

External links
 

1862 births
1928 deaths
Artists from Brussels
Belgian Impressionist painters
Belgian etchers
Belgian lithographers
Académie Royale des Beaux-Arts alumni
20th-century lithographers